Javier Iruretagoyena Amiano (born 1 April 1948), Irureta for short, is a Spanish retired football attacking midfielder and manager.

He had a distinguished playing career with Atlético Madrid and Athletic Bilbao, playing in 344 La Liga games for both teams combined and scoring 70 goals.

Irureta managed several Spanish top flight clubs, most notably Deportivo. He was the only person to have coached both the two major Galician (Deportivo and Celta) and Basque (Athletic and Real Sociedad) sides.

Playing career

Atlético Madrid
Irureta was born in Irun, Gipuzkoa, making his senior debut for local Real Unión in 1965. Two years later he helped them reach the second division play-offs, before joining Atlético Madrid later that year. During his time at the club he was part of a team that won two La Liga titles and a Copa del Rey, playing alongside the likes of Adelardo, Luis Aragonés and José Eulogio Gárate.

The Colchoneros also reached the European Cup final in 1974, but after the winners, FC Bayern Munich, declined to participate in the Intercontinental Cup, they were invited as runners-up: facing Club Atlético Independiente of Argentina the side won 2–1 on aggregate, with Irureta scoring one of the goals in the 2–0 second-leg home victory.

Athletic Bilbao
After eight seasons at Atlético, Irureta returned to the Basque Country and signed for Athletic Bilbao. The highlight of his career there was winning two runners-up medals in 1977 – Spanish and UEFA Cups, as among his teammates were veteran José Ángel Iribar and an emerging José Ramón Alexanko.

Irureta retired in 1980 aged 32, with more than 400 official matches to his credit and nearly 100 goals.

Spain
Irureta won six caps for Spain in a three-year span (exactly two years and 11 months). However, he did not experience a successful time with the national side, and never took part in any major tournament; his debut came on 23 May 1972 in a 2–0 friendly win with Uruguay, in Madrid.

Towards the end of his playing career, Irureta also played one game for the Basque Country national team.

Coaching career

Early years / Deportivo
As a coach, Irureta started with lowly Sestao Sport Club and joined CD Logroñés four years later, then led Real Oviedo to a sixth-place finish in the 1990–91 season, with subsequent qualification to the UEFA Cup – he repeated the feat with RC Celta de Vigo (where he was awarded Manager of the Year titles by both Don Balón and El País) in 1998. In 1994–95 he briefly returned to Athletic Bilbao, then coached neighbours Real Sociedad.

However, Irureta's greatest successes came with Deportivo de La Coruña where he spent seven years, winning another Don Balón coaching accolade in 2000. In his second year he led Depor to its first ever league title, adding runner-up finishes in 2001 and 2002 and third-places in the following two years while also reaching the UEFA Champions League quarter-finals in 2001 and 2002 and the semi-finals in 2004; in 2002 they also won the domestic cup, beating Real Madrid at the Santiago Bernabéu Stadium.

Betis
Irureta was appointed at Real Betis in June 2006 on a one-year contract, being sacked on 21 December after the team's poor start to the campaign. He stated: "My contract has been rescinded by mutual agreement but I made the first move. We could have continued like this for much longer but it wasn't good".

Later career
In October 2007, Irureta put his name forward to be the new coach of English club Bolton Wanderers, but lost out in the running to Gary Megson, and was also touted by December as possible replacement for Real Sociedad's Chris Coleman.

Eventually, he took over at Real Zaragoza after replacing Víctor Fernández. However, on 3 March 2008, after merely one and a half months in charge, he resigned, arguing that never as a manager had he lost four games in a row, and that he did not feel up to the task of stopping the Aragonese side's slump into the relegation zone (eventually, they dropped down a tier). He was quickly replaced by former Zaragoza goalkeeper Manolo Villanova, whom at the time was in charge of SD Huesca.

Managerial statistics

Honours

Player
Atlético Madrid
La Liga: 1969–70, 1972–73
Copa del Generalísimo: 1971–72; runner-up: 1974–75
Intercontinental Cup: 1974
European Cup runner-up: 1973–74

Athletic Bilbao
UEFA Cup runner-up: 1976–77
Copa del Rey runner-up: 1976–77

Manager
Deportivo
La Liga: 1999–2000
Copa del Rey: 2001–02
Supercopa de España: 2000, 2002

Individual
Don Balón Award: Best Coach 1999–2000

References

External links

Athletic Bilbao manager profile

1948 births
Living people
Sportspeople from Irun
Spanish footballers
Footballers from the Basque Country (autonomous community)
Association football midfielders
La Liga players
Tercera División players
Real Unión footballers
Atlético Madrid footballers
Athletic Bilbao footballers
Spain under-23 international footballers
Spain amateur international footballers
Spain international footballers
Basque Country international footballers
Spanish football managers
La Liga managers
Segunda División managers
Segunda División B managers
Sestao Sport managers
CD Logroñés managers
Real Oviedo managers
Racing de Santander managers
Athletic Bilbao managers
Real Sociedad managers
RC Celta de Vigo managers
Deportivo de La Coruña managers
Real Betis managers
Real Zaragoza managers